The 1888 Republican National Convention was a presidential nominating convention held at the Auditorium Building in Chicago, Illinois, on June 19–25, 1888. It resulted in the nomination of former Senator Benjamin Harrison of Indiana for president and Levi P. Morton of New York, a former Representative and Minister to France, for vice president. During the convention, Frederick Douglass was invited to speak and became the first African-American to have his name put forward for a presidential nomination in a major party's roll call vote; he received one vote from Kentucky on the fourth ballot.

The ticket won in the election of 1888, defeating President Grover Cleveland and former Senator Allen G. Thurman from Ohio.

Venue
The convention was held in Chicago's Auditorium Theatre. Since the construction on the theater had not been completed in time for the convention, a tent canvas was utilized as a temporary roof during the convention. Controversy was generated, with labor movement supporters taking issue with the non trade union labor utilized in the construction of the Auditorium Building (which the theater is a component of).

Issues addressed 

Issues addressed in the convention included support for protective tariffs, repeal of taxes on tobacco, support for the use of gold and silver as currency and support for pensions for veterans. The party also expressed its opposition to polygamy.

Presidential nomination

Nominated

Not Nominated 

The early favorite for the nomination was James G. Blaine. After he disclaimed interest, several candidates vied for the prize, with the frontrunners being Russell A. Alger, Walter Q. Gresham, Chauncey Depew, and John Sherman. After several ballots, none of the leading candidates was able to obtain a majority. Benjamin Harrison, who had served in the U.S. Senate from 1881 to 1887, but had lost reelection after the Democrats gained control of the Indiana legislature, was a dark horse candidate. Republicans were dispirited after losing the presidency in 1884 and were attracted to Harrison because of the speech announcing his presidential candidacy, in which he described himself as a "living and rejuvenated Republican." Harrison won the nomination on the eighth ballot and "Rejuvenated Republicanism" became the party's campaign slogan.

Vice Presidential nomination

Vice Presidential candidates 

Blaine, who had recommended Harrison for the presidential nomination, suggested former Representative and Minister to Austria-Hungary William Walter Phelps of New Jersey for vice president. Thomas C. Platt, an influential political boss in New York State, supported fellow New Yorker Levi P. Morton, a former Representative and Minister to France. He had been asked in 1880, but declined. This time Morton decided to accept. He was easily elected on the first ballot as Platt's support of Morton helped him defeat Phelps by a margin of five to one.

Vice Presidential Balloting / 6th Day of Convention (June 25, 1888)

Accusation of delegate vote-buying 

Nearly a decade later, Ohio candidate John Sherman accused Michigan candidate millionaire Russell A. Alger of buying the votes of Southern delegates who had already confirmed their vote for Sherman. In Sherman's 1895 two-volume book "Recollections" he asserted, "I believe, and had, as I thought, conclusive proof, that the friends of Gen. Alger substantially purchased the votes of many of the delegates from the Southern States who had been instructed by their conventions to vote for me." Once accused, Alger submitted correspondence to the New York Times, who published one letter from 1888, written after the convention to Alger, where Sherman states, "if you bought some [votes], according to universal usage, surely I don't blame you." Later in the same New York Times article, Alger insisted neither he or friends bought a single vote. The article also quotes another delegate, James Lewis, who claimed that "the colored delegates of the South will unite on a Union soldier in preference" instead of a civilian.

When Sherman introduced his antitrust legislation two years later, his main example of unlawful combination drew from a Michigan Supreme Court case involving Diamond Match Company and Alger's participation as president and stock holder.

See also 
 History of the United States Republican Party
 List of Republican National Conventions
 U.S. presidential nomination convention
 1888 United States presidential election
 1888 Democratic National Convention

References

External links 
 Republican Party platform of 1888 at The American Presidency Project
 Harrison acceptance letter at The American Presidency Project
 Guide to the Republican National Convention Collection 1884-1888 at the University of Chicago Special Collections Research Center

Republican National Conventions
Political conventions in Chicago
1888 United States presidential election
1888 in Illinois
1888 conferences
June 1888 events